The 1932 William & Mary Indians football team represented the College of William & Mary as a member of the Virginia Conference during the 1932 college football season. Led by second-year head coach John Kellison, the Indians compiled an overall record of 8–4 with a mark of 4–1 in conference play, placing second in the Virginia Conference.

Schedule

References

William and Mary
William & Mary Tribe football seasons
William and Mary Indians football